Gary Nolan may refer to:

Gary Nolan (baseball) (born 1948), baseball player
Gary Nolan (radio host) (born 1954), radio host
Gary Nolan (rugby league), English rugby league player
Gary Nolan (politician), American politician